Passports of the European Economic Area may refer to:

 Passports of the EFTA member states
 Passports of the European Union